Kohnab-e Pain (also Romanized as Kohnāb-e Pā‘īn; also known as Kahnāb and Kohnāb) is a village in Gowharan Rural District, Gowharan District, Bashagard County, Hormozgan Province, Iran. At the 2006 census, its population was 95, in 17 families.

References 

Populated places in Bashagard County